Local Election Commission of Albania (abbrievated as KZAZ) are the local KQZ in Albania. They are used as local voting districts. Votes are counted by the KZAZ.

References

External links
Central Election Commission of Albania

Election commissions in Albania
Politics of Albania